François de Peynier, vicomte de Souillac was born on 2 July 1732 in Périgord. He was Governor of Isle Bourbon (now Réunion), Governor General of the Mascarene Islands and Pondichéry.

Biography 
Souillac joined the Navy as a Garde-Marine on 24 September 1744. He was promoted to Ensign in 1749, Lieutenant in 1757, and to Captain in 1772.

From 1775, he was military commander of Isle Bourbon (now La Réunion). On 15 October 1776, Souillac wrote an ordinance founding the "Quartier du Repos de Laleu". On 8 March 1777, he issue another decree attempting to make hunting for the runaway slaves more humane.

Souillac served in the War of American Independence under Suffren.

On 1 May 1779 he became Governor General by interim of the islands of Mauritius and Bourbon. On 30 January 1780 he was confirmed in that position.

Souillac was promoted to Chef d'escadre in 1784.

He left the Indian Ocean in 1787 and died in 1803.

Legacy 
Today a village of Mauritius is named after him. There is a street named after him in Pondicherry. A small beach in the Port Glaud district of Mahé, Seychelles is named "Anse Souillac" after him.

Titles

Notes, citations, and references 
Notes

Citations

References

French colonial governors and administrators
Governors of Réunion
Governors of French India